Earl of Ilchester is a title in the Peerage of Great Britain. It was created in 1756 for Stephen Fox, 1st Baron Ilchester, who had previously represented Shaftesbury in Parliament. He had already been created Baron Ilchester, of Ilchester in the County of Somerset in 1741, and Baron Ilchester and Stavordale, of Redlynch, in the County of Somerset, in 1747. These titles were also in the Peerage of Great Britain. All three peerages were created with remainder, failing heirs male of his own, to his younger brother Henry Fox, who was himself created Baron Holland in 1763. The brothers were the only sons from the second marriage of the politician Sir Stephen Fox.

In 1758 the first Earl assumed by Royal licence the additional surname of Strangways, which was the maiden name of his wife's maternal grandmother. He was succeeded by his eldest son, the second Earl. He represented Midhurst in Parliament. His eldest son, the third Earl, served as Captain of the Yeomen of the Guard from 1835 to 1841 in the Whig administration of Lord Melbourne and was also Lord Lieutenant of Somerset from 1837 to 1839. Lord Ilchester survived both his sons and was succeeded by his half-brother, the fourth Earl. He was Ambassador to the German Confederation from 1840 to 1849. His nephew, the fifth Earl, was Captain of the Honourable Corps of Gentlemen-at-Arms from 1873 to 1874 in the Liberal government of William Ewart Gladstone and also served as Lord Lieutenant of Dorset from 1885 to 1905. On the death in 1964 of his grandson, the seventh Earl, the line of the eldest son of the first Earl failed. The seventh Earl was succeeded by his fourth cousin, the eighth Earl.   the titles are held by his grandson, the tenth Earl, who succeeded his uncle in 2006.

The family seat was Melbury House, near Evershot, Dorset. The family, through Ilchester Estates, owns and manages large portions of land in the county of Devon and the Holland House estate west of Holland Park in Kensington, London. The family inherited much land in the 17th century from the Wadham family of Merryfield, Ilton in Somerset and of Edge, Branscombe in Devon, and in 1874 from their distant cousins the Fox family of Holland House, Kensington.

Earls of Ilchester (1756)
Stephen Fox-Strangways, 1st Earl of Ilchester (1704–1776)
Henry Thomas Fox-Strangways, 2nd Earl of Ilchester (1747–1802)
Henry Stephen Fox-Strangways, 3rd Earl of Ilchester (1787–1858)
William Thomas Horner Fox-Strangways, 4th Earl of Ilchester (1795–1865)
Henry Edward Fox-Strangways, 5th Earl of Ilchester (1847–1905)
Giles Stephen Holland Fox-Strangways, 6th Earl of Ilchester (1874–1959)
Edward Henry Charles James Fox-Strangways, 7th Earl of Ilchester (1905–1964)
Walter Angelo Fox-Strangways, 8th Earl of Ilchester (1887–1970)
Maurice Vivian de Touffreville Fox-Strangways, 9th Earl of Ilchester (1920–2006)
Robin Maurice Fox-Strangways, 10th Earl of Ilchester (b. 1942)

Present peer
Robin Maurice Fox-Strangways, 10th Earl of Ilchester (born 2 September 1942) is the son of Raymond George Fox-Strangways, younger son of the 8th Earl, and his wife Margaret Vera Force. He was educated at Loughborough College and had a career with Lloyds Bank. In 2003 he was living at Frankton, Warwickshire. On 2 July 2006 he succeeded to the peerages.

On 19 July 1969, he married Margaret Elizabeth Miles, daughter of Geoffrey Miles, and they had two children:
Simon James Fox-Strangways, Lord Stavordale (1972–2018)
Lady Charlotte Helen Fox-Strangways (born 1974), who had a career in nursing and married Stephen Hobin

The heir presumptive (and last in line to the earldom) is the present peer's younger brother Paul Andre Fox-Strangways (born 1950), a university lecturer.

See also
Baron Holland
Charles James Fox

References

Work cited

Kidd, Charles, Williamson, David (editors). Debrett's Peerage and Baronetage (1990 edition). New York: St Martin's Press, 1990, 

Fox-Strangways, Earls of Ilchester, archive (ref:D/FSI), estate and family papers, 965-1900s, held at the Dorset History Centre

 
Earldoms in the Peerage of Great Britain
Earl
Noble titles created in 1756